Lauren Goodnight (born May 19, 1980) is an American radio host, voice actress, sex educator, and occasional singer. She is well known in the brony community, as she is the voice of Twilight Sparkle in the Doctor Who/My Little Pony: Friendship is Magic crossover radio program Dr. Whooves Adventures.

Career
Goodnight has been the host for the call-in show 8-bit Sex on the 8bitx.com website and Celestia Radio, Fridays at 10pm EST.  She is a professional member of the American Association of Sexuality Educators, Counselors and Therapists and the Sexual Medicine Society of North America. She is based in South Carolina. Goodnight used to be a voice actress who worked for Section23 Films, most notably as Natsue Awayuki in Prétear. She also worked with Antarctic Press and Fred Perry on the animation of Gold Digger, in the role of Brittany Diggers. From 2004 to 2006, Goodnight was a music reviewer for Anime on DVD. She is very well known in the brony community, as she is the voice of Twilight Sparkle, the co-star, among other voices, in the My Little Pony/Doctor Who crossover radio program Dr. Whooves Adventures, airing on Celestia Radio and YouTube.

Personal life
Lauren is a regular at conventions, such as AnimeCon, BronyCon, BUCKcon, TrotCon, and other My Little Pony-related conventions. She frequently takes vacations to the United Kingdom, as she is an anglophile. She has been said to like the Celestia Radio show Tree Time, a pun on "tea time", by the hosts of the show themselves.

Roles
Angelic Layer – narrator
Aquarian Age: Sign for Evolution – Arayashiki West, Sarashina
D.N.Angel – Girl A (ep 21), Little Girl (ep 25)
Neon Genesis Evangelion Director's Cut – additional voices
Noir – additional voices
Pretear – Natsue Awayuki
RahXephon – additional voices
Sorcerer Hunters OAV – Shiorena (ep 3)
Super GALS! – various minor roles
Gold Digger: Time Raft – Brittany Diggers
Nana's Everyday Life – Nana
Dr Whooves Adventures – Twilight Sparkle (ongoing); Derpy Hooves ("Wrong Way Backwards," "DWA Short: Express Delivery: An April Fool's Day Sketch"); Rarity ("Number 12: Part One", "DWA Short: Fashionably Late", "Wrong Way Backwards," "DWA Short: Lovestruck"); The Professor (Alternative Universe Doctor) ("DWA Short: Crossed Wires", "Pony in a Box Extra's: She's the Professor"); Celestia ("Shadows of the Lunar Republic")
Dr Whooves and Assistant – Twilight Sparkle, (crossover episode "Wrong Way Backwards");  Herself (2013 April Fools Special "The Vampire Hazard") 
Daring Do Adventures – Headmaster ("Daring Do and the Sapphire Stone" uncredited)
8-bit Sex – co-host

References

External links
 
 
 
 

1980 births
Living people
American voice actresses
21st-century American women